John Patrick Barrett (February 25, 1899 – September 30, 1966) was a professional football player from Holyoke, Massachusetts. He played during the early years of the National Football League. A graduate of the University of Detroit Mercy, Barrett made his professional debut in the NFL in 1924 with the Akron Pros. He played for the Pros, Detroit Wolverines, Detroit Panthers and Pottsville Maroons over the course of his career.

Notes

1899 births
1966 deaths
American football offensive linemen
Detroit Titans football players
Akron Pros players
Detroit Panthers players
Pottsville Maroons players
Detroit Wolverines (NFL) players
Players of American football from Massachusetts
Sportspeople from Holyoke, Massachusetts